Florence is a home rule-class city in Boone County, Kentucky, United States. Florence is the second largest city located in Northern Kentucky, after Covington, and part of the Greater Cincinnati Metropolitan Area. The population was 31,946 at the 2020 census, making it the state's eighth-largest city and also the state's largest that is not a county seat.

History
The Florence area was originally known as Crossroads, because of the convergence of several roads from Burlington and Union at Ridge Road (now U.S. 25). By 1821, the area was known as Maddentown for Thomas Madden, a Covington attorney who owned a farm on the Burlington Pike. When Madden moved away, the area became known as Connersville in 1828 for Jacob Conner, a settler who assumed responsibility for the growing town. The town was finally renamed Florence because there was another Connersville in Harrison County. The name presumably is for Florence, Italy, but the specific etymology is unclear. It was incorporated on January 27, 1830, and grew quickly after the completion of the Covington-Lexington Turnpike in 1836.

Geography
Florence is located in eastern Boone County at  (38.993225, -84.642602). U.S. Routes 25, 42, and 127 pass through the center of Florence, leading northeast in a concurrency  to downtown Cincinnati. Interstates 75 and 71 pass through the western part of Florence, with access from exits 178 through 182.

Demographics
As of the census of 2000, there were 23,551 people, 9,640 households, and 6,073 families residing in the city. Today the racial makeup of the city is 80% White, 10% African American, 0.14% Native American, 4% Asian, 0.06% Pacific Islander, 1% from other races, and 3% from two or more races. Hispanic or Latino of any race were 8% of the population.

There were 9,640 households, of which 32.1% had children under the age of 18 living with them, 46.2% were married couples living together, 12.8% had a female householder with no husband present, and 37.0% were non-families. 30.2% of all households were made up of individuals, and 11.1% had someone living alone who was 65 years of age or older. The average household size was 2.41 and the average family size was 3.03.

23.7% of the population was under the age of 18, 10.7% from 18 to 24, 33.0% from 25 to 44, 19.6% from 45 to 64, and 16.2% who were 65 years of age or older. The median age was 33 years. For every 100 females, there were 90.4 males. For every 100 females age 18 and over, there were 86.7 males.

The median income for a household in the city was $57,348, and the median income for a family was $52,160. Males had a median income of $36,677 versus $26,323 for females. The per capita income for the city was $31,588. About 8.1% of families and 8.5% of the population were below the poverty line, including 11.5% of those under age 18 and 14.0% of those age 65 or over.

In terms of population, Florence gained 2.2% over one year and gained 14.2% over the course of the decade.  As of April 2020, the city's population was 31,946 citizens. It is the seventh largest city in the Cincinnati/Northern Kentucky metropolitan area.

Landmarks

Florence is well known in surrounding cities for a water tower visible from I-71/I-75 that reads "Florence Y'all". Built in 1974, the tower originally advertised the up-and-coming Florence Mall, as part of an agreement with the mall developers who donated the land for the tower. But because the mall was not built yet, the tower violated highway regulations, and the city was forced to change it within a short deadline. Rather than repaint the entire tower, they simply painted over the two vertical lines of the "M" to create a "Y". The intent was to change it back when the mall was built, but the local residents liked the tower's new proclamation, so the city decided to leave it as it was.

Culture

Sports
The city is home to the Florence Y'alls independent minor league baseball team. The Y'alls have played at Thomas More Stadium in Florence since the venue's completion in 2004.

Education
Florence is served by Boone County Schools. Gateway Community and Technical College has a campus located south of town.

Florence has a public library, a branch of the Boone County Public Library.

Economy
Major employers in Florence include St. Elizabeth Healthcare, Boone County Schools, Robert Bosch, SWECO, Meritor, Eagle Manufacturing, Walmart, Costco Wholesale, and the City of Florence. Major employers in unincorporated areas with Florence addresses include Celanese, Citigroup, Crane Composites, DRS, Duro Bag Mfg, Givaudan, Kellogg's, Mubea, RR Donnelley, Schwan's, Staples, and Taylor & Francis. Companies based in Florence include Kona Ice.

Notable people
 Shaun Alexander, former NFL player
 Kenny Price, country music singer, made appearances on Hee Haw
 Delano E. Williamson, Indiana Attorney General

References

External links
 City website
 Boone County
 Historical documents and images

Cities in Boone County, Kentucky
1830 establishments in Kentucky
Populated places established in 1830
Cities in Kentucky